The Vocational Training Council (VTC) is the largest vocational education, training and professional development group in Hong Kong. Established in 1982, the VTC provides valuable credentials for some 250,000 students each year through a full range of pre-employment and in-service programmes with internationally recognised qualifications.

History
The VTC was established in 1982 to provide skills-based training to the Hong Kong workforce. The first programmes began in 1984 at the newly established campus in Kowloon Bay, focusing on craft-based and operative courses. in 1986, the VTC expanded to two new locations in Tuen Mun and Sha Tin. in 1991, the Skills Centre was established in Tuen Mun to provide skills training to students with disabilities. in 1993, new campuses were established in Tsing Yi and Chai Wan which aimed to provide sub-degree programmes, previously operated by polytechnic colleges. in 1999 a number of technical colleges were merged under the umbrella of the VTC to create the Institute of Vocational Education.

In 2000, the VTC established the Chinese Cuisine Training Institute in Pokfulam. In 2003, the School for Higher and Professional Education was established to provide top-up degree programmes and the Institute of Professional Education and Knowledge was set up to provide post-graduate and professional skills development programmes. In 2004, the VTC established the Youth College as an alternative to the standard high-school education system for students. In 2006, the VTC became the first vocational training organisation to gain accreditation from the Hong Kong Council for Accreditation of Academic and Vocational Qualifications. In 2007, the Hong Kong Design Institute began offering design-related courses to students. In 2008, the Integrated Vocational Development Centre was set up to provide skills-development courses. In 2009, the WMG School for Professional Development was established, in a partnership with University of Warwick, to provide Master's-level degree courses. In 2011, the VTC opened the T-Hotel, which was the first such student-run hotel in Hong Kong, which is used to provide training to hospitality students. In 2012, the Technological and Higher Education Institute of Hong Kong was established to offer courses which combine traditional academic studies with more practical elements.

Roles
In addition to its role as a provider of vocational education in Hong Kong, the VTC also acts as an advisory body to the Hong Kong Government on issues related to the vocational and training needs of Hong Kong.

Under The Vocational Training Council Ordinance (CAP 1130), the VTC is also tasked with: the promotion of apprenticeships in Hong Kong; providing vocational training opportunities to disabled persons over the age of 15; to provide courses for the improvement of industry in Hong Kong; and, to create and manage the facilities required to carry out these activities. In order to achieve these goals, the VTC is required to present an annual report to the Chief Executive covering all relevant information.

Member institutions
The VTC has a wide variety of member institutions, each with a different industry or discipline focus.

Controversies
The losses resulted from mismanagement of VTC resources, such as housing for senior staff; the upkeep of facilities which were underused; and the payment of cash in lieu of leave to staff.

In 2012, it came to light that some instructors at the VTC were providing their students with unfair advantages in an attempt to boost their exam results. This was attributed to the practice of tying instructor contracts to student performance and pass-rates.

References

External links

 Vocational Training Council website

Educational organisations based in Hong Kong
Vocational education in Hong Kong
Organizations established in 1982
1982 establishments in Hong Kong